A ballpark (or ball park, also known as a baseball park or baseball stadium), is a venue where baseball is played.

For baseball parks–including those with "ball park" and "ballpark" in their name–see Lists of baseball parks.

Ball park or ballpark may also refer to:

 Ball Park Franks, the name of a brand of hot dogs made by Hillshire Brands
 Ball Park Music, a five-piece indie rock/pop band based in Brisbane, Australia
 Ballpark estimate, a rough estimate
 Ballpark model, a system under which users of a facility do so at their own risk

See also
 The Ballpark (disambiguation)
 Ballpark station (disambiguation)